Dano may refer to:

People
 Dano (name)
 Ken Daneyko (born 1964), Canadian retired National Hockey League player nicknamed "Dano"

Places
 Dano Department, a department or commune in Burkina Faso
 Dano, Burkina Faso, a town and capital of the department
 Dano (woreda), a district in the Oromia Region of Ethiopia

Other uses
 Dano language of Papua New Guinea
 Dano (Korean festival), the Korean equivalent of the Double Fifth festival
 BeOS R5.1d0, a prerelease of the Be Operating System also known as Dano

See also
 Danno (disambiguation)
 Deno (disambiguation)
 Lambert Daneau (c. 1535–c. 1590), French jurist and Calvinist theologian